Tabbaliyu Neenade Magane (meaning: You've become orphan, son) is a novel written by novelist S.L. Bhyrappa. This book is about a conflict of a culture with modern views of an educated person in a village of India. Author introduced the characters and develop them throughout the book who represent the different views and fight for moral truth and scientific truths. This book is suitable to the people who wants to know about village life and background of cow as a God in India.

The movies Tabbaliyu Neenade Magane and Godhuli directed by Girish Karnad and B. V. Karanth, released on 1977 was based on this novel.

See also

S.L. Bhyrappa's novels 

Bheemakaaya
Dharmashree
Doora saridaru
Matadana
Naayi Neralu
Gruhabhanga
Nirakarana
Grahana
Daatu
Anveshana
Parva
Nele
Sakshi
Anchu
Tantu
Saartha
Mandra
Aavarana
Kavalu
Yaana
Uttarakaanda

S.L. Bhyrappa's autobiography 

Bhitti

References

1968 novels
Kannada novels
1968 Indian novels
Indian novels adapted into films
Novels by S. L. Bhyrappa